Néstor Susaeta Jaurrieta (born 11 December 1984) is a Spanish professional footballer who plays as a winger.

Having been on the books of Real Sociedad and Athletic Bilbao without making a first-team appearance, he spent most of his career in the Segunda División, totalling 271 games and 25 goals for six clubs. He represented mostly Rayo Vallecano, Oviedo and Albacete, also making two La Liga appearances for the first of those teams.

Club career
Born in Eibar, Gipuzkoa, Susaeta began his career with Real Sociedad. He only appeared for the reserves during his spell with the Txuri-urdin, also being loaned to SD Eibar and UD Salamanca – both clubs in the Segunda División – and being released in 2007.

In that summer, Susaeta joined Basque neighbours Athletic Bilbao on a two-year deal, but again only featured with the B side, in the Segunda División B. In his sole season he received little playing time and trialled for Scotland's Hamilton Academical in December 2007 before being released. He signed for another team in that level, AD Alcorcón, being one of the most important players as they reached the promotion playoffs, ultimately falling short.

Susaeta moved to Rayo Vallecano of division two on a free transfer in June 2009, appearing in 31 games in his first year but in only 14 the following (three starts) as the club returned to La Liga after an eight-year absence. Having played two top-flight matches, on 3 January 2012 he terminated his contract and signed with FC Lausanne-Sport of the Swiss Super League until 30 June, with the option of another term. 

Susaeta left at the end of the campaign, and moved to CD Guadalajara in July 2012. One year later, following his team's relegation from the second tier, he signed a two-year deal with Real Oviedo in the third.

On 2 August 2017, Susaeta joined Albacete Balompié as a free agent. He terminated his contract with the club on 24 July 2020, and signed for third division side CF Rayo Majadahonda.

Personal life
Susaeta's cousin, Markel, was also a footballer and a winger. He spent most of his professional career with Athletic Bilbao.

Honours
Oviedo
Segunda División B: 2014–15

References

External links

1984 births
Living people
Spanish footballers
Footballers from Eibar
Association football wingers
La Liga players
Segunda División players
Segunda División B players
Primera Federación players
Real Sociedad B footballers
SD Eibar footballers
UD Salamanca players
Bilbao Athletic footballers
AD Alcorcón footballers
Rayo Vallecano players
CD Guadalajara (Spain) footballers
Real Oviedo players
Albacete Balompié players
CF Rayo Majadahonda players
Swiss Super League players
FC Lausanne-Sport players
Spanish expatriate footballers
Expatriate footballers in Switzerland
Spanish expatriate sportspeople in Switzerland